Senator Daggett may refer to:

Beverly Daggett (1945–2015), Maine State Senate
David Daggett (1764–1851), U.S. Senator for Connecticut
Harry Daggett (1857–1933), Wisconsin State Senate